Coleraine (from  , 'nook of the ferns') is a town and civil parish near the mouth of the River Bann in County Londonderry, Northern Ireland. It is part of Causeway Coast and Glens district.

Description 
Coleraine had a population of 24,634 people in the 2011 Census. The North Coast (Coleraine and Limavady) area has the highest property prices in Northern Ireland, higher even than those of affluent South Belfast.

Coleraine during the day is busy but relatively quiet at night. Much of the nightlife in the area centres on the nearby seaside resort towns of Portrush and Portstewart, with the three towns forming a combined visitor area known as “The Triangle”.

Coleraine is home to one of the largest Polish communities in Northern Ireland.

The town square is called 'The Diamond' and is the location of Coleraine Town Hall.

St. Patrick's Church of Ireland is in the town centre, with churches for other denominations all within walking distance.

The University of Ulster campus was built in the 1960s and brought a theatrical space to the town in the form of the Riverside Theatre.

The town has a large catchment area and is designated as a "major growth area" in the Northern Ireland Development Strategy.

History 

Coleraine has a long history of settlement. The Mesolithic site at Mount Sandel, which dates from approximately 5935 BC is some of the earliest evidence of human settlement in Ireland.

The 9th-century Hagiography Tripartite Life of Saint Patrick records how the town got its name. When Patrick arrived in the neighbourhood, he was received with great honour and hospitality by the local chieftain, Nadslua, who offered him a piece of ground on which to build a church. The spot was next to the river Bann and was overgrown with ferns, which were being burned by some boys to amuse themselves. This incident led to the area being called Cúil Raithin ("nook of ferns"), which was later anglicised as Colrain, Colerain and Coleraine. It was translated by Colgan into Latin as Secessus Filicis.

The town was one of the two urban communities developed by the London Companies in County Londonderry in the Plantation of Ulster at the start of the 17th century. The slightly skewed street pattern of Coleraine's town centre is the legacy of that early exercise in town planning, along with traces of the lines of the ramparts that provided the Plantation town with its defences.

During the War of the Two Kings (1689–91) Coleraine was a centre of Protestant resistance to the rule of James II. Richard Hamilton's Irish Army made an attempt to seize the town but was repulsed. The Protestants were forced to abandon the town shortly afterwards and withdrew to Derry. Later the same year, following the failed Siege of Derry, Sir Charles Carney and his Jacobite garrison fled the town on receiving news of the advance of Percy Kirke's Enniskillen forces and the landing at Carrickfergus of Marshal Schomberg. The Williamites controlled Coleraine for the remainder of the war.

With some industrialisation, the expansion of the river port, and the development of the railway, the town expanded significantly throughout the 19th century and into the early part of the 20th century, especially after the Second World War. The population doubled due to a number of factors: major industrial development on extensive suburban sites; the decision to site the New University of Ulster (now known as the Ulster University) in the town; the expansion of commerce; and the development of sporting and recreational facilities.
Since 1980 growth has continued but at a slightly more modest pace. In the twenty years to 2001 the town's population increased by 22% to approximately 25,000 but the rate of increase fell from 12% in the 1980s to 8% in the 1990s.

The Troubles 
During the Troubles in Northern Ireland, a total of 13 people were killed in or near Coleraine. Ten of these people were killed in two separate car bomb explosions, although in very different circumstances.

On 12 June 1973, the Provisional Irish Republican Army (IRA) detonated a car bomb on Railway Road, with inadequate warning. Six Protestant civilians, all in their 60s and 70s, were killed. The second most fatal incident occurred on 2 October 1975 but in this case, all four victims were members of the loyalist paramilitary group the Ulster Volunteer Force (UVF), killed when their own bomb went off as they travelled through Farrenlester near Coleraine. A third bombing occurred on 13 November 1992 when the IRA detonated a large van bomb in the town centre. Although extensive property damage was caused, which resulted in several major buildings being demolished, no one was killed. Coleraine Town Hall required major structural work, and was not reopened until August 1995.

The other three people to be killed in Coleraine were all shot by loyalist paramilitaries. One was Danny Cassidy, a Sinn Féin electoral worker who was killed by the Ulster Freedom Fighters and the other two were also civilians with no paramilitary connections. One was killed by the UVF and the other by a non-specific loyalist group.

In literature 

The poetical illustration The Coleraine Salmon Leap by Letitia Elizabeth Landon, in Fisher's Drawing Room Scrap Book, 1836, refers to an abundance of salmon in the river here in those times, and to a considerable sport derived therefrom. It accompanies an engraving of a painting of the salmon leap by Thomas Mann Baynes.

Governance 
Coleraine was the headquarters of the former Coleraine Borough Council, before this was amalgamated in 2015 to form the Causeway Coast and Glens District Council, which is now based in the former Coleraine Borough Council headquarters. The Borough Council area together with the neighbouring district of Limavady, forms the East Londonderry constituency for elections to the Westminster Parliament and Northern Ireland Assembly, despite some of the borough being in County Antrim.

In 2014, the residents elected 3 Democratic Unionist Party, 2 Ulster Unionist Party, 1 Progressive Unionist Party, 1 Northern Ireland Conservatives and 1 Social Democratic and Labour Party councillors.

Tourism 
Coleraine is near the Causeway Coast tourist route, attracting over 2 million annual visitors. A UNESCO World Heritage Site, the Giant's Causeway, is a 25-minute bus ride away. The distillery village of Bushmills is served by buses from the town and there is a narrow-gauge steam train running in the summer from Bushmills to the Giant's Causeway. Also north of Coleraine is the scenic coastal town of Portstewart, with a sandy beach and coastal walks. Portrush is part of the Borough.

North-west of Coleraine lies the small village of Castlerock, with a beach which is essentially a continuation of the beach at Portstewart, separated by the mouth of the River Bann. Also nearby is the beach at Benone Strand and Mussenden Temple, built by Frederick Augustus Hervey, an 18th-century Anglican bishop atop a precipitate cliff and overlooking County Donegal in one direction and Scotland in another. The bishop's residence, Downhill House, which is managed by the National Trust, fell into disrepair after the Second World War.

Climate 

Coleraine experiences a maritime climate with cool summers and relatively mild winters. Rainfall at Coleraine typically peaks at over  during the month of October. The driest month is May, with an average of under . On average, 173 days of the year will report at least  of rain, ranging from 18 days in January to 11 days during June. The following table summarises temperature averages sampled between 1971 and 2000.

Places of interest 
The east side of the town is distinguished by Mountsandel Forest, which contains the Mount Sandel fort, an ancient site which has been claimed as the oldest site of human settlement in Ireland. Here wooden houses dating from about 7000 BC were uncovered. The fort can be accessed via Mountsandel forest, the closest entrance being the side near the Coleraine Courthouse. There is another fort about two miles south of Mountsandel near the small village of Loughan.

Notable people

Living people 

 Richard Archibald – rower
 Alan Campbell – rower
 Joel Cassells — rower
 Peter Chambers – rower
 Richard Chambers – rower
 Jack Doherty – potter
 Michelle Fairley – actress
 Maureen Madill – golfer, coach and broadcaster
 Jenna McCorkell – British ladies' figure skating champion
 Gerry McKenna – biologist and university vice chancellor
 James Nesbitt – actor
 Maggie O'Farrell – novelist
 Damien O'Kane – folk singer
 Tommy Sheppard – Scottish politician
 Claire Sugden – politician
 Andrew Trimble – rugby union player
 Bronagh Waugh – actress
 Jayne Wisener – actress

Historical figures 

 John Bodkin Adams – general practitioner and suspected serial killer
 Alexander Anderson – physicist
 Lewis Thomas Drummond – lawyer, judge, political figure
 Harry Gregg MBE – goalkeeper
 Sam Henry – civil servant, antiquarian, lecturer, writer, photographer, folklorist, and folk-song collector
 Sir Thomas Ranken Lyle – mathematical physicist
 Patrick McGilligan – politician
 Hercules Mulligan – tailor and spy during the American Revolutionary War
 Edward Nicolls – Royal Marines officer
 Bertie Peacock – footballer
 Isaac Todd – merchant
 Charles Frederick Williams – journalist and war correspondent
 Edmund Mackenzie Young – Australian banker, financier/investor and grazier
 Peter Dermot Doherty - footballer and manager

Education 
Coleraine has a variety of educational institutions at all levels.

Primary and secondary schools 
The local schools include:

 Saint John's Primary School
 Irish Society's Primary School
 Coleraine Grammar School
 Coleraine College
 St Joseph's College, Coleraine
 D.H Christie Memorial Primary School
 Killowen Primary School
 Loreto College, Coleraine (a co-educational Roman Catholic grammar school)
 Harpurs Hill Primary School
 Millburn Primary School
 Saint Malachy's Primary School
 North Coast Integrated College
 Macosquin Primary School
 Sandelford Special School
 Ballysally Primary School

Tertiary 
Coleraine is the location of a University of Ulster campus and houses the university's administration buildings. It is the original campus of what was the New University of Ulster (established in 1968) which merged with the former Ulster Polytechnic at Jordanstown just north of Belfast in 1984 to form the present-day institution. The university was placed in the top five of UK universities by the 2014 Research Excellence Framework for its law, biomedical, and humanities programs. The Causeway Institute is a College of Further and Higher Education based in Coleraine, with another campus in nearby Ballymoney.

Transport 
Coleraine railway station opened on 4 December 1855 and shares facilities with the town's Ulsterbus bus depot. Passenger service is delivered via the Belfast-Derry railway line along the scenic shore of Lough Foyle and the Coleraine-Portrush railway line branch line. The Belfast-Derry railway line is to be upgraded to facilitate more frequent trains and improvements to the permanent way such as track and signalling to enable faster services.

The railway station was closed for goods traffic on 4 January 1965.

Sport 
Coleraine itself contains Coleraine Rugby Club, established in 1921, Coleraine F.C., established in 1927 and currently in the IFA Premiership and CLG Eoghan Rua established in 1957. Coleraine is one of the hosting towns for the Milk Cup.

Coleraine is part of the circuit for the North West 200, a series of motorcycle road races organised by the Coleraine and District Motor Club.

Coleraine Bowling Club is a lawn bowls club on Lodge Road and was founded in 1903. Coleraine is one of the most successful teams in the NIPBA and Irish bowling, with 64 titles on the honours list. The Bannsiders have claimed two Irish Bowling Association Senior Challenge Cup victories, in 1921 and 2013. Coleraine have also provided a number of international players and Commonwealth Games representatives, most notably Victor Dallas and Roy Fulton.

Coleraine Cricket Club plays in the North West Senior League.

In the wider local area are a number of well-known golf courses, including Castlerock Golf Club, Royal Portrush Golf Club and Portstewart Golf Club.

The Coleraine area has a significant equestrian presence. Of particular interest is RDA Coleraine (Riding for the Disabled Association (Coleraine & District Group), which provides riding opportunities for anyone with a physical and/or learning disability at their £1.75 million RDA Causeway Coast Arena at Castleroe (see website www.rdacoleraine.org). The new arena was funded by SportNI, Coleraine Borough Council, and by donations from the people of the district. The conditions of grant aid included the provision of a first-class sporting arena for RDA, the equestrian fraternity, and other sporting activities. Especially important is the development of The OWLS Sports Club (Opportunities Without Limits), which will coordinate the development of a range of different sporting opportunities for persons with physical and/or learning disabilities, and in many cases their siblings. To facilitate this process SportNI has funded a Sports Development Officer.

Demography
Coleraine is classified as a large town (i.e. with a population between 18,000 and 75,000 people).

2011 Census
On Census day (27 March 2011) there were 24,634 people living in Coleraine, accounting for 1.36% of the NI total. Of these:

 19.91% were aged under 16 years and 14.89% were aged 65 and over;
 52.16% of the usually resident population were female and 47.84% were male;
 68.08% belong to or were brought up in a 'Protestant and Other Christian (including Christian related)' denomination and 24.09% belong to or were brought up in the Catholic Christian faith;
 66.16% indicated that they had a British national identity, 31.52% had a Northern Irish national identity and 10.19% had an Irish national identity (respondents could indicate more than one national identity);
 38 years was the average (median) age of the population.
 13.67% had some knowledge of Ulster-Scots and 4.77% had some knowledge of Irish (Gaelic).

Other places internationally 

Coleraine, as a town name, exists in other countries. In the United States, for example, several places are named after Coleraine, including two townships in Ohio: Colerain Township, Belmont County and Colerain Township, Hamilton County.

In 1853, a surveyor named Lindsay Clarke was working on a township called Bryans Creek Crossing in Victoria, Australia. He renamed the town Coleraine.

International relations
International projects, under the guidance of Coleraine Borough Council, include the Zomba Action Project – a charity founded in 2003 to provide aid to the municipality of Zomba in southern Malawi. The region was chosen due to the historical connections between the Presbyterian and Catholic churches and Malawi, sustained by a number of specific local contacts. Donations have been used to fund computers, education, medical and other projects.

Coleraine is twinned with French town La Roche-sur-Yon.

See also 
 Coleraine cheddar
 County Coleraine
 List of towns in Northern Ireland
 List of villages in Northern Ireland
 List of localities in Northern Ireland by population
 List of civil parishes of County Londonderry
 O'Cahan

References

External links 

 Activ Coleraine – an online guide to Coleraine

 
Towns in County Londonderry
Civil parishes of County Londonderry
Causeway Coast and Glens district